Ruszów may refer to the following places in Poland:
Ruszów, Lower Silesian Voivodeship (south-west Poland)
Ruszów, Lublin Voivodeship (east Poland)